The 1979–80 Algerian Championnat National was the 18th season of the Algerian Championnat National since its establishment in 1962. A total of 14 teams contested the league, with MP Alger as the defending champions, The Championnat started on october 5, 1979. and ended on June 13, 1980.

Team summaries

Promotion and relegation 
Teams promoted from Algerian Division 2 1979-1980 
 ESM Bel-Abbès
 WKF Collo

Teams relegated to Algerian Division 2 1980-1981
 USK Alger
 IR Saha

League table

References

External links
1979–80 Algerian Championnat National

Algerian Ligue Professionnelle 1 seasons
1979–80 in Algerian football
Algeria